Battleship is an unincorporated community located in Raleigh County, West Virginia, United States. Battleship has been known by two other names: Ralco and West Whitby. The community was part of the Winding Gulf Coalfield.

References 

Unincorporated communities in West Virginia
Coal towns in West Virginia
Unincorporated communities in Raleigh County, West Virginia